Glyphipterix pygmaeella is a moth of the  family Glyphipterigidae. It is found on the Canary Islands and in Hungary and Romania.

The wingspan is 7-7.5 mm.

References

Moths described in 1896
Glyphipterigidae
Moths of Europe